Archibald Chapman Hart (February 27, 1873 in Lennoxville, Quebec – July 24, 1935 in Teaneck, New Jersey) was an American lawyer, military veteran, and Democratic Party politician who represented New Jersey's 6th congressional district in the United States House of Representatives from 1912 to 1913 and again from 1913 to 1917.

Early life and education
Hart was born in Lennoxville, Quebec on February 27, 1873. He moved with his parents to New York City in 1882 and to Hackensack, New Jersey, in 1884. He attended the common schools and studied law. He was admitted to the New Jersey bar in 1896 and commenced practice in Hackensack.

Spanish American War
Hart served in the Second Regiment, New Jersey Volunteer Infantry, during the Spanish–American War and served four years in the Twenty-third Regiment of the New York Army National Guard. By profession, he was a banker, publisher, and real estate operator.

He was also selected as a delegate to the 1908 Democratic National Convention.

Congress
Hart was elected as a Democrat to the Sixty-second Congress to fill the vacancy caused by the resignation of William Hughes and served in office from November 5, 1912, to March 3, 1913, but was an unsuccessful candidate for the Democratic nomination in 1912 to the Sixty-third Congress.

He was later elected to this Congress to fill the vacancy caused by the death of Lewis J. Martin and reelected to the Sixty-fourth Congress, where he served in office from July 22, 1913, to March 3, 1917. He declined to be a candidate for renomination in 1916.

Later career and death
He resumed the practice of law and his former business pursuits in Hackensack and resided in Teaneck, New Jersey. He was the prosecuting attorney for Bergen County from 1920–1930.

He died in Teaneck on July 24, 1935, and was interred in Hackensack Cemetery in Hackensack.

References

External links
 
 Archibald Chapman Hart at The Political Graveyard
 

1873 births
1935 deaths
Politicians from Hackensack, New Jersey
People from Teaneck, New Jersey
Politicians from Sherbrooke
Democratic Party members of the United States House of Representatives from New Jersey